Varzeqan (also Romanized as Varzeqān and Varzaqān) is a village in Barvanan-e Markazi Rural District of Torkamanchay District, Mianeh County, East Azerbaijan province, Iran. At the 2006 National Census, its population was 1,180 in 254 households. The following census in 2011 counted 953 people in 268 households. The latest census in 2016 showed a population of 1,015 people in 352 households; it was the largest village in its rural district.

References 

Meyaneh County

Populated places in East Azerbaijan Province

Populated places in Meyaneh County